The 1886 FA Cup final was a football match between Blackburn Rovers and West Bromwich Albion on Saturday, 3 April 1886 at Kennington Oval in south London. The result was a goalless draw. Albion wanted to play extra time but Blackburn declined and so a replay was necessary. This took place a week later at the Racecourse Ground in Derby, the first venue outside London to stage an FA Cup final match. Blackburn won 2–0 to win the tournament for the third successive time. Following Wanderers (1876–1878), Blackburn were the second team to win three successive finals and, as of 2022, remain the last to do so. Their goals were scored by Jimmy Brown and Joe Sowerbutts. Both matches were refereed by Major Francis Marindin.

The replay was the final match of the 1885–86 FA Cup, the 15th edition of the world's oldest football knockout competition, and England's primary cup competition, the Football Association Challenge Cup, better known as the FA Cup. Blackburn were making their fourth (of eight) appearances in the final; Albion their first (of ten). It was the first final to involve two extant clubs who are still members of either the Premier League or the English Football League.

Route to the final

Blackburn Rovers

Following their debut in 1879–80, this was the seventh time Blackburn Rovers played in the FA Cup. Having been runners-up in 1881–82, they had won the competition in both 1883–84 and 1884–85. Blackburn began the 1885–86 tournament with an away tie at nearby Clitheroe. They won this 2–0 and then had three successive home ties before being awarded a bye through the fifth round (the last sixteen) to the quarter-finals. They were drawn away to Brentwood at the Essex County Cricket Ground where Blackburn won 3–1 to reach the semi-finals. This match, played on 13 March at the Derbyshire County Cricket Ground, was against Swifts. Blackburn won 2–1 with goals scored by Nat Walton and Thomas Strahan.

West Bromwich Albion

West Bromwich Albion made their FA Cup debut in 1883–84 and this was their third season in the competition. They were drawn at home in every round prior to the semi-final. In the first two rounds, they defeated Aston Unity 4–1 and Wednesbury Old Athletic 3–2. They received a bye to the fourth round, where they beat Wolverhampton Wanderers 3–1. Old Carthusians were defeated by a single goal in the fifth round. A hat-trick from Jem Bayliss—the first by an Albion player in the FA Cup—contributed to a 6–0 quarter-final victory over Old Westminsters, putting Albion into the FA Cup semi-final for the first time (they had reached the quarter-final in 1884–85). The semi-final took place at Aston Lower Grounds and was against one of Albion's local rivals, Small Heath Alliance. Albion won 4–0—Arthur Loach and George Woodhall each scoring twice—to become the first Midlands club to reach the FA Cup Final. After the game, Small Heath supporters invaded the pitch and then pelted missiles at vehicles bound for West Bromwich, causing several injuries.

Match

Pre-match
The 1886 final was the first to involve two extant clubs who are still members of either the Premier League or the English Football League. The match took place on the same day as the University Boat Race and, in its Sporting Intelligence section the following Monday, the Daily News reported that the kick-off was delayed until four o'clock so that people attending the Boat Race would be able to see the final too. The newspaper said the crowd was "probably the largest to attend an FA Cup final".

Final
The syndicated match report, published in each of the Daily News, The Morning Post and The Standard, said there was "an immense number of spectators, numbering about 17,000".

According to the Daily News, Blackburn refused to play extra time because they realised that Albion "had the better of them". The FA said the replay would be the following Saturday, 10 April, at either Derby or Kennington. The Standard, however, correctly specified Derby as the replay venue.

Replay
The replay in Derby on 10 April was the first FA Cup final match to be played outside London. There were fears that the match would have to be postponed when Derby was hit by a blizzard that morning, but it blew over and the snow had thawed before the kick-off was due. Albion supporters carried cards saying "Play Up Throstles". Nat Walton played for Blackburn instead of Joseph Heys. Albion were unchanged.

Details

Final

Replay

See also
 1885–86 West Bromwich Albion F.C. season

Notes

References

Sources

External links
 FA Cup Results Archive
 1885–86 Competition Results at rsssf.com
 FA Cup Final lineups
 Soccerbase summary – first match
 Soccerbase summary – replay
 Match report at www.fa-cupfinals.co.uk

 

1886
1885–86 in English football
1886 sports events in London
April 1886 sports events
Blackburn Rovers F.C. matches
West Bromwich Albion F.C. matches